Andy Seitz (born December 13, 1985) is an American former competitive pair skater. He teamed up with Kendra Moyle in February 2005. Together, they are the 2006 U.S. Junior national champions and 2006 World Junior silver medalists. They skated on both the Junior Grand Prix and senior Grand Prix circuit in the 2006/2007 season. He previously skated with sister Lindsey Seitz.

Seitz announced his retirement from competitive skating on April 4, 2007.

Programs 
(with Moyle)

Competitive highlights

With Seitz

With Moyle

References

External links

 
 

Living people
1985 births
American male pair skaters
Sportspeople from Davenport, Iowa
Sportspeople from Ypsilanti, Michigan
World Junior Figure Skating Championships medalists
21st-century American people